Agrapatana is a village in the Nuwara Eliya District, Central Province, Sri Lanka.

Industry 
The town is surrounded by numerous tea estates (including Holmwood Estate (Map), Sutton Division, Agra Uvah, Hauteville Estate and Glasgow Estate). The tea produced in Agrapatana is of high quality and typically demands a high price in the tea market.

Population 
Majority of people living in this area are Tamils however there are Sinhalese and Muslim ethnic communities as well. The Tamil people living in Agrapatana have their origin in South Indian State, Tamil Nadu who were brought to be employed as tea workers by British during the Colonial period (1815-1947).

Education
Agrapatana Tamil Maha Vidyalayam and Sinhala Maha Vidyalaya are situated in the vicinity.

See also
List of towns in Central Province, Sri Lanka

External links

Populated places in Nuwara Eliya District